Sérgio Ricardo de Moraes (born July 23, 1982) is a Brazilian mixed martial artist who formerly competed in the welterweight and middleweight division's for the Ultimate Fighting Championship. He was a competitor on The Ultimate Fighter: Brazil.

Background
Moraes is often called “O Orgulho da Cohab”  meaning literally “The Pride of Cohab”. Moraes was born in Cohab.

Moraes is a 4-time Brazilian Jiu Jitsu World Champion but his most famous fight was when he defeated Kron Gracie at the 2008 World Championship. Moraes's affiliation is the Alliance Jiu Jitsu Team.

Sérgio is currently the head Jiu Jitsu instructor at Evolução Thai in Curitiba, Brazil. Currently instructing at Reza Martial Arts Center Bahrain.

Mixed martial arts career

Early career
Moraes made his professional MMA debut in October 2006 in his native Brazil. Over the next five years, he amassed a record of 6 wins and 1 loss, with 5 of his 6 wins coming via submission.

Moraes made his United States debut in June 2009 for Bellator Fighting Championships. After being rocked early in the round, Moraes was able to get a takedown and quickly lash up a Triangle choke to defeat Josh Martin via submission in the first round at Bellator 12.

The Ultimate Fighter
In March 2012, Moraes appeared as a fighter on The Ultimate Fighter: Brazil. In the opening elimination fight, he defeated former Muay Thai World Champion Thiago Rela by submission due to a heel hook from the 50/50 guard, midway through round 1 to get into the TUF house.

In the first round of the competition, Moraes fought Delson Heleno. Moraes defeated Heleno via submission (rear naked choke) early in the first round to move onto the semi-final round. There, Moraes fought Daniel Sarafian for a spot at the finals. Moraes was knocked out by Sarafian in the first round by a flying knee.

Ultimate Fighting Championship
Moraes made his UFC debut on June 23, 2012 at UFC 147 against Cezar Ferreira to determine the winner of The Ultimate Fighter: Brazil. He stepped in as a replacement for Sarafian, who was injured.<ref>{{cite web|url=http://mmajunkie.com/news/29233/with-mutante-vs-sarafian-official-ufc-147s-main-card-complete-with-five-bouts.mma|title=Sergio Moraes replaces injured Daniel Sarafian in TUF: Brazil' middleweight final|publisher=mmajunkie|date=June 18, 2012|url-status=dead|archive-url=https://web.archive.org/web/20120620235300/http://mmajunkie.com/news/29233/with-mutante-vs-sarafian-official-ufc-147s-main-card-complete-with-five-bouts.mma|archive-date=June 20, 2012}}</ref> Moraes lost the fight by unanimous decision after being knocked down twice by Ferreira.

Moraes fought fellow TUF Brazil alumnus Renée Forte on October 13, 2012 at UFC 153. After being outstruck for much of the bout, Moraes rallied back in the third round and defeated a visibly exhausted Forte by submission due to a rear naked choke.

Moraes faced Neil Magny on August 3, 2013 at UFC 163.  Moraes won the fight via triangle choke in the first round.  The win also earned him his first Submission of the Night'' bonus award.

Moraes was expected to face Zak Cummings on November 30, 2013 at The Ultimate Fighter 18 Finale. However, Cummings and Moraes had to pull out of the event due to injury and were replaced by Sean Spencer and Drew Dober respectively.

Moraes was expected to face Peter Sobotta on April 11, 2015 at UFC Fight Night 64.  However, Sobotta was forced out of the bout citing injury and was replaced by Gasan Umalatov.  In turn, Umalatov also pulled out with injury and was replaced by promotional newcomer Mickaël Lebout.  Moraes won the fight via unanimous decision.

The fight with Sobotta was rescheduled for June 20, 2015 at UFC Fight Night 69.  On June 9, the fight was scrapped once again as Moraes pulled out for undisclosed reasons. He was replaced by promotional newcomer Steve Kennedy.

Moraes faced Omari Akhmedov on December 10, 2015 at UFC Fight Night 80. He won the fight via KO in the third round.

Moraes was expected to face Kamaru Usman on May 14, 2016 at UFC 198. However, Usman was replaced on the card for undisclosed reasons by promotional newcomer Luan Chagas. The fight was scored a split draw.

Moraes was expected to face Michael Graves on November 19, 2016 at UFC Fight Night 100. However, Graves was removed from the fight on October 3 after he was arrested on a misdemeanor battery charge. Moraes instead faced Zak Ottow on the card. Moraes was awarded a split decision victory.

Moraes was expected to face Max Griffin but Griffin pulled out of the fight and Moraes faced promotional newcomer Davi Ramos on March 11, 2017 at UFC Fight Night 106. He won the fight via unanimous decision. After the fight with Ramos, Moraes signed a new, six-fight deal with UFC.

A rescheduled bout with Kamaru Usman eventually took place on September 16, 2017 at UFC Fight Night 116. Moraes lost the fight via knockout in the first round.

Moraes was scheduled to face promotional newcomer Abubakar Nurmagomedov on February 3, 2018 at UFC Fight Night: Machida vs. Anders. Within the same day, for undisclosed reasons, Nurmagomedov was replaced by Tim Means. Moraes won the fight via split decision.

Moraes faced Ben Saunders on September 22, 2018 at UFC Fight Night 137. He won the fight via a submission in round two.

Moraes faced Anthony Rocco Martin on March 9, 2019 at UFC Fight Night 146. He lost the fight by unanimous decision.

Moraes faced Warlley Alves on May 11, 2019 at UFC 237. He lost the fight via knockout in the third round.

Moraes faced James Krause on November 16, 2019 at UFC on ESPN+ 22. He lost the fight via knockout in round three and was subsequently released from the UFC.

Post-UFC career
On September 8, 2020, news surfaced that Moraes had signed with Taura MMA and made his promotional debut against Jared Revel at Taura MMA 10 on October 23, 2020. He lost the fight via unanimous decision.

Championships and accomplishments

Mixed martial arts
Ultimate Fighting Championship
Submission of the Night (One time) vs. Neil Magny

Mixed martial arts record

|-
|Loss
|align=center|14–7–1
|Jared Revel
|Decision (unanimous)
|Taura MMA 10
|
|align=center|3
|align=center|5:00
|Rio de Janeiro, Brazil
| 
|-
|Loss
|align=center|14–6–1
|James Krause
|KO (punches) 
|UFC Fight Night: Błachowicz vs. Jacaré 
|
|align=center|3
|align=center|4:19
|São Paulo, Brazil
| 
|- 
|Loss
|align=center|14–5–1
|Warlley Alves
|KO (punch)
|UFC 237
|
|align=center|3
|align=center|4:13
|Rio de Janeiro, Brazil
|
|-
|Loss
|align=center|14–4–1
|Anthony Rocco Martin
|Decision (unanimous)
|UFC Fight Night: Lewis vs. dos Santos 
|
|align=center|3
|align=center|5:00
|Wichita, Kansas, United States
|
|-
|Win
|align=center|14–3–1 
|Ben Saunders
|Submission (arm-triangle choke)
|UFC Fight Night: Santos vs. Anders 
|
|align=center|2
|align=center|4:42
|São Paulo, Brazil
|
|-
|Win
|align=center|13–3–1 
|Tim Means
|Decision (split)
|UFC Fight Night: Machida vs. Anders 
|
|align=center|3
|align=center|5:00
|Belém, Brazil
|
|-
|Loss
|align=center|12–3–1 
|Kamaru Usman
|KO (punch)
|UFC Fight Night: Rockhold vs. Branch 
|
|align=center|1
|align=center|2:48
|Pittsburgh, Pennsylvania, United States
|
|-
|Win
|align=center|12–2–1 
|Davi Ramos
|Decision (unanimous)
|UFC Fight Night: Belfort vs. Gastelum
|
|align=center|3
|align=center|5:00
|Fortaleza, Brazil
|
|-
|Win
|align=center|
|Zak Ottow
| Decision (split)
|UFC Fight Night: Bader vs. Nogueira 2
|
|align=center| 3
|align=center| 5:00
|São Paulo, Brazil
|  
|-
|Draw
|align=center|10–2–1
|Luan Chagas
|Draw (split)
|UFC 198
|
|align=center|3
|align=center|5:00
|Curitiba, Brazil
| 
|-
|Win
|align=center|10–2
|Omari Akhmedov
|TKO (punches)
|UFC Fight Night: Namajunas vs. VanZant
|
|align=center|3
|align=center|2:18
|Las Vegas, Nevada, United States
|    
|-
| Win
| align=center| 9–2
| Mickaël Lebout
| Decision (unanimous)
| UFC Fight Night: Gonzaga vs. Cro Cop 2
| 
| align=center| 3
| align=center| 5:00
| Kraków, Poland
| 
|-
| Win
| align=center| 8–2
| Neil Magny
| Submission (triangle choke)
| UFC 163
| 
| align=center| 1
| align=center| 3:13
| Rio de Janeiro, Brazil
| 
|-
| Win
| align=center| 7–2
| Renée Forte
| Submission (rear-naked choke)
| UFC 153
| 
| align=center| 3
| align=center| 3:10
| Rio de Janeiro, Brazil
|
|-
| Loss
| align=center| 6–2
| Cezar Ferreira
| Decision (unanimous)
| UFC 147
| 
| align=center| 3
| align=center| 5:00
| Belo Horizonte, Brazil
| 
|-
| Win
| align=center| 6–1
| Etoube Manuelo
| Submission (americana)
| Jungle Fight 18: São Paulo
| 
| align=center| 1
| align=center| 1:43
| São Paulo, Brazil
| 
|-
| Loss
| align=center| 5–1
| Brett Cooper
| KO (punch)
| Jungle Fight 16
| 
| align=center| 2
| align=center| 4:59
| Rio de Janeiro, Brazil
| 
|-
| Win
| align=center| 5–0
| Tommy Depret
| Submission (rear-naked choke)
| Jungle Fight 15
| 
| align=center| 1
| align=center| 3:55
| São Paulo, Brazil
| 
|-
| Win
| align=center| 4–0
| Josh Martin
| Submission (triangle choke)
| Bellator 12
| 
| align=center| 1
| align=center| 4:21
| Hollywood, Florida, United States
| 
|-
| Win
| align=center| 3–0
| Gerson Silva
| Decision (unanimous)
| Mo Team League: Final 
| 
| align=center| 3
| align=center| 5:00
| São Paulo, Brazil
| 
|-
| Win
| align=center| 2–0
| André Santos
| Submission (triangle choke) 
| Mo Team League 2
| 
| align=center| 1
| align=center| 2:07
| São Paulo, Brazil
| 
|-
| Win
| align=center| 1–0
| Anderson Carioca
| Submission (rear-naked choke)
| Real Fight 3 
| 
| align=center| 1
| align=center| N/A
| São Paulo, Brazil
| 

|-
| Loss
| align=center| 2–1
| Daniel Sarafian
| KO (flying knee)
| rowspan=3|The Ultimate Fighter: Brazil
| N/A
| align=center| 1
| align=center| 4:07
| rowspan=3|São Paulo, Brazil
| <small>Fought at 185
|-
| Win
| align=center| 2–0
| Delson Heleno
| Submission (rear-naked choke)
| N/A
| align=center| 1
| align=center| 4:27
| <small>Fought at 185
|-
| Win
| align=center| 1–0
| Thiago Rela
| Submission (heel hook)
| N/A
| align=center| 1
| align=center| 2:15
| <small>Fought at 185
|-

See also
 List of current UFC fighters
 List of male mixed martial artists

References

External links

1982 births
Living people
Brazilian practitioners of Brazilian jiu-jitsu
Brazilian male mixed martial artists
Welterweight mixed martial artists
Mixed martial artists utilizing Brazilian jiu-jitsu
Sportspeople from São Paulo
People awarded a black belt in Brazilian jiu-jitsu
Ultimate Fighting Championship male fighters